The CMLL Universal Championship (2019) is a professional wrestling tournament produced and scripted by Consejo Mundial de Lucha Libre (CMLL; "World Wrestling Council"). The tournament started on February 2, 2019 and ran for three Super Viernes shows with the final held on February 14, 2019 at Arena México in Mexico City, Mexico.

The CMLL Universal Championship is an annual tournament exclusively for wrestlers who hold a CMLL-recognized championship at the time of the tournament. The tournament was first held in 2009, but not held in 2018 for unexplained reasons, making the 2019 version the tenth overall tournament. Being a professional wrestling tournament, it is not won legitimately; it is instead won via predetermined outcomes to the matches that is kept secret from the general public. In the finals of the 2019 tournament Mexican National Heavyweight Champion El Terrible defeated the CMLL World Light Heavyweight Champion Niebla Roja to become a two-time tournament winner.

Background
The tournament featured 15 professional wrestling matches under single-elimination tournament rules, which means that wrestlers would be eliminated from the tournament when they lose a match. All male "non-regional" CMLL champions at the time of the tournament were eligible to participate in the tournament. The CMLL World Mini-Estrella Championship is exclusively for CMLL's Mini-Estrella division and thus not eligible for the tournament. Regionally promoted championships such as the CMLL Arena Coliseo Tag Team Championship and the Occidente championships promoted in Guadalajara, Jalisco have not been included in the tournament in the past; only titles that have been defended in CMLL's main venue Arena Mexico, although exceptions have been made to allow New Japan Pro-Wrestling (NJPW) champions to compete if they were in Mexico at the time. Both Euforia and Eléctrico were eligible for the tournament, but neither champion participated.

Eligible champions

Tournament

References

2019 in professional wrestling
CMLL Universal Championship
2019 in Mexico
2010s in Mexico City